Carlos Humberto Balcázar Tamayo (born 9 January 1984) is a Mexican former professional footballer. He last played as a midfielder for Irapuato at the Ascenso MX League in Mexico.

Biography
Born in Guadalajara, he started his career at hometown club Atlas. He also played for the Atlas reserve teams Coyotes de Sonora and Académicos at Primera División A. In January 2008 he left for Chiapas and played at both Primera División and Primera División A (for Jaguares de Tapachula).

In December 2009, he returned to Atlas.

References

External links

1984 births
Living people
Footballers from Guadalajara, Jalisco
Association football midfielders
Mexican footballers
Atlas F.C. footballers
Chiapas F.C. footballers
Leones Negros UdeG footballers
Irapuato F.C. footballers
Liga MX players